See Hua Daily News is the largest and best selling Chinese-language daily newspaper on the island of Borneo. It is widely circulated in the Sultanate of Brunei and the Malaysian states of Sarawak and Sabah, all on the northern coast of the island. Headquartered in Kuching, it has a current editorial staff of about 300.

External links 
 Official website 

1952 establishments in North Borneo
Newspapers published in Malaysia
Chinese-language newspapers (Simplified Chinese)
Mass media in Kuching
Chinese-language mass media in Malaysia